Gymnoscelis lindbergi is a moth in the family Geometridae. It is found on Cape Verde.

The wingspan is 13–20 mm.

References

Moths described in 1957
Gymnoscelis
Moths of Cape Verde
Moths of Africa